(24 December 1907 - 8 October 1951) was a Japanese boxer who competed in the 1932 Summer Olympics.

He was the national champion in the flyweight division for two years running in 1930–31, winning at the Japan Amateur Boxing Association's Japanese Amateur Boxing Championships. In 1932 he was eliminated in the quarter-finals of the flyweight class after losing his fight to Thomas Pardoe.

References

1907 births
Flyweight boxers
Olympic boxers of Japan
Boxers at the 1932 Summer Olympics
Japanese male boxers
1951 deaths
20th-century Japanese people